Kader Keïta (born 6 November 2000) is an Ivorian professional footballer who plays for Turkish club Sivasspor.

Club career
After playing for the reserve side of Ajaccio, Keïta joined Lille's reserve team in summer 2017. He joined Westerlo on a three-year contract in summer 2019.

On 31 August 2021, Keïta joined Swiss Super League club Sion on a year-long loan with an option to buy.

On 12 August 2022, Keïta signed a three-year contract with Sivasspor in Turkey.

International career
Keïta is a dual-citizen of France and the Ivory Coast. He was selected as part of the Ivory Coast Olympic squad for the 2020 Summer Olympics, and made 3 appearances at the Olympics.

Honours 
Westerlo

 Belgian First Division B: 2021–22

References

External links

2000 births
Living people
French sportspeople of Ivorian descent
French footballers
Ivorian footballers
Ivorian expatriate footballers
Association football midfielders
Paris FC players
AC Ajaccio players
Lille OSC players
K.V.C. Westerlo players
FC Sion players
Sivasspor footballers
Challenger Pro League players
Championnat National 2 players
Championnat National 3 players
Swiss Super League players
Süper Lig players
Footballers at the 2020 Summer Olympics
Olympic footballers of Ivory Coast
Ivorian expatriate sportspeople in Belgium
Ivorian expatriate sportspeople in Switzerland
Ivorian expatriate sportspeople in Turkey
Expatriate footballers in Belgium
Expatriate footballers in Switzerland
Expatriate footballers in Turkey